WOXD (95.5 FM, "Bullseye 95.5") is a classic hits music radio station based in the Oxford area in the U.S. state of Mississippi.

External links

OXD
Classic hits radio stations in the United States